Sir Lachlan Maclean, 1st Baronet of Morvern, (c. 1600 – 18 April 1649) the 17th Clan Chief of Clan Maclean. Lachlan was granted his Baronet title by Charles I and he became the Clan Chief on the death of his brother in 1626. He fought as a Royalist under James Graham, 1st Marquess of Montrose during the Wars of the Three Kingdoms at the Battle of Inverlochy, Battle of Auldearn and Battle of Kilsyth. From 1628 to 1633 he sat in the Parliament of Scotland as shire commissioner for Tarbert. From his rule onward, all Maclean clan chiefs are successive Baronets of Movern.

Biography
He was the second son of Hector Og Maclean, 15th Clan Chief. His mother was the daughter of Colin Mackenzie of Kintail. He became Clan Chief at the death of his brother in 1626. He was originally contacted by Archibald Campbell, 1st Marquess of Argyll at the beginning of the Wars of the Three Kingdoms (1644–1651), but he sided with the Royalists.

The evening before the Battle of Inverlochy he met with Montrose in Lochaber. [He was] present at the battle accompanied with 30 men only. After which coming home he raised his whole Clan, and joined Montrose immediately after the Battle of Alford, and continued with him till after the Battle of Kilsyth. When coming home he and the brave Alasdair MacColla defeated a party of Argyle's consisting of seven hundred men at Laggan mor in Lorn, they having but about two hundred, the rest of their men being severed from them by the darkness of the preceding night. He made ready a second time for joining Montrose, and, after he began his march, he was acquainted that the King had ordered Montrose to disband his Army. Upon [which] Maclean kept himself quietly at home. Sometime after Sir David Leslie coming to the Island of Mull with a strong party of horse and foot obliged him to deliver eight Irish gentlemen, who sheltered themselves with him. Seven of whom were executed at Aros, the eighth making his escape by the swiftness of his horse.

Sir Lachlan Maclean was married to Mary MacLeod, the second daughter of Sir Roderick Macleod of Macleod, 15th Chief, by whom he had two sons and three daughters: 
Isabella Maclean (c1630-?), who married Sir Ewen Cameron of Lochiel (1629–1719)
Mary Maclean, who married Sir Lachlan "Mor" Mackinnon (28th clan chief)
Marian Maclean, who died young and unmarried
Sir Hector Maclean, 2nd Baronet (c1640-1651), his heir and successor
Sir Allan Maclean, 3rd Baronet (1645–1674)

He had ruled for twenty three years before his own death in 1649. He was succeeded by his eldest son, Sir Hector Maclean, 2nd Baronet.

Ancestors

References
 

1600s births
1649 deaths
Lachlan
Shire Commissioners to the Parliament of Scotland
Members of the Parliament of Scotland 1628–1633
Baronets in the Baronetage of Nova Scotia